is a Japanese businessman. He has been president and representative director of the Japanese Commercial vehicles chain Isuzu since 2007. Hosoi was elected President and Representative Director of Isuzu, replacing Yoshinori Ida.

References

External links
 Isuzu.co.jp

1949 births
Living people
Isuzu
Japanese corporate directors